Man with a Gun is a low-budget 1958 British crime film directed by Montgomery Tully from a screenplay by Michael Winner. It starred Lee Patterson, Rona Anderson and John Le Mesurier.

Plot
Insurance investigator Mike Davies looks into a suspicious fire that burned down a nightclub. He initially suspects the club's manager, Harry Drayson, but after Davies meets Drayson's niece Stella, she helps him uncover a mob protection scheme responsible for the arson.

Cast
Lee Patterson as Mike Davies 
Rona Anderson as Stella 
John Le Mesurier as Harry Drayson
 Bill Nagy as Joe Harris 
Marne Maitland as Max 
Glen Mason as Steve Riley
Carlo Borelli as Carlo 
Harold Lang as John Drayson
Cyril Chamberlain as Supt. Wood
Dorinda Stevens as Club Receptionist

Critical reception
TV Guide called it a "so-so crime story. Despite some fast pacing in the direction, the script is too simplistic for the fare."

References

External links

1958 films
1958 crime films
Films directed by Montgomery Tully
Films scored by Ron Goodwin
British crime films
Films with screenplays by Michael Winner
Films about arson
Films about extortion
Nightclub fires
1950s English-language films
1950s British films